Alexander Kutschera (born 21 March 1968) is a German former professional footballer who played as a defender for Eintracht Frankfurt, among other clubs.

References

1968 births
Living people
German footballers
TSV 1860 Munich players
Eintracht Frankfurt players
Bundesliga players
2. Bundesliga players
KFC Uerdingen 05 players
Xerez CD footballers
FC Bayern Munich II players
FC Bayern Munich footballers
Association football defenders
German expatriate sportspeople in Spain
Expatriate footballers in Spain
Segunda División players
People from Freising
Sportspeople from Upper Bavaria
Footballers from Bavaria
West German footballers